Greg Milburn (born 21 August 1979), better known as "Greg Wood", is a British actor from Manchester, England, known for playing Trevor Royle in Channel 4 soap Hollyoaks, Rick Neelan in ITV soap Coronation Street and Terry Gibson in Channel 4 soap Brookside. He is the brother of fellow actor Matt Milburn, who has also starred in Hollyoaks and Coronation Street.

Career
Wood usually plays villainous or threatening characters. His first acting role was in Hollyoaks, playing one of the bullies in the groundbreaking portrayal of Luke Morgan's rape and would then go on to play what is possibly his best-known role in Brookside (as Greg Milburn) playing drug dealer Terry Gibson. Wood later reprised the role for the spin-off DVD Unfinished Business and was one of four nominated for Soap Villain of the Year.

Since leaving Brookside, he has appeared in The Courtroom, Casualty 1907 and has appeared twice in Emmerdale.

Wood is the brother of Matt Milburn who played Joe Spencer in Hollyoaks, and footballer Tommy Orpington in Coronation Street.

In 2009, Wood joined Coronation Street in which he played a loan shark, Rick Neelan. On 14 April 2010, Coronation Street was cleared by Ofcom for broadcasting a scene where Greg's character Rick Neelan pushed a burning newspaper through someone's letterbox. 31 people complained about the scene, claiming that the show had incited and encouraged crime. However, Ofcom ruled that it was "not likely to encourage or incite the commission of crime or lead to disorder".

In 2013, Wood rejoined Hollyoaks to play the villainous character Trevor Royle, a pivotal player in the exit of long running character Jacqui McQueen.

Filmography

References

External links

Living people
English male soap opera actors
1979 births
Male actors from Manchester